State Route 135 (SR 135) is a  state highway in the south-central part of the U.S. state of Georgia. It connects the Florida state line with Higgston, via Lakeland, Willacoochee, Douglas, and Hazlehurst. It travels concurrently with U.S. Route 221 for extensive distances, a short piece in Lakeland and a longer one from Douglas to Uvalda.

Route description
SR 135 begins at the Florida state line intersecting with County Road 141 (CR 141) south. In Echols County it intersects SR 94, and SR 376. SR 135 enters Lowndes County west of Valdosta. The only major junction in the county is with US 84/SR 38. SR 135 then enters Lanier County south of Stoctkon. In downtown, it travels concurrently with US 221/SR 31 for a short distance. North of Lakeland, it travels concurrently with SR 64. SR 135 enters southeast of Nashville. Just north of the county line, SR 64 splits off and joins SR 168. SR 135 also intersects SR 76, which terminates at SR 135. SR 135 enters Atkinson County south of Willacoochee. In Willacoochee, it travels concurrently for a short distance with US 82 and SR 520. SR 135 enters Coffee County south of Douglas, where it also travels parallel to a former Central of Georgia Railway right-of-way. In Douglas, it travels concurrently with SR 206 before the latter terminates. At the terminus, SR 135 travels concurrently with US 221 again. Together, they intersect SR 32, SR 158, and SR 206 Conn. before leaving Douglas. SR 135 enters Jeff Davis County southwest of Hazlehurst. It intersects SR 107 just north of Denton; SR 107 terminates at SR 135. In Hazlehurst, US 221 splits off for a short way, while SR 135 picks up SR 135 Conn. SR 135 then picks US 221 back up, heading north. They then travel concurrently with US 23, US 341, SR 19, and SR 27. After intersecting SR 19 Conn, these roads split off. SR 135 enters Montgomery County south of Uvalda. In Uvalda, US 221 splits off at an intersection with SR 56. North of Uvalda, SR 135 intersects SR 130. In Higgston, SR 135 terminates at US 280, SR 15, SR 29, and SR 30.

Major intersections

Special routes

Lakeland loop route

State Route 135 Loop (SR 135 Loop) is a  unsigned loop route south of the city limits of Lakeland, consisting entirely of Burnt Church Road. It begins at an intersection with SR 135 south of Darsey Pond, then curves to the northeast. At Union Church and the cemetery across the street from it, the road begins to curve to the northwest and then travels to the west just south of the Lakeland city limits. The highway intersects SR 135 Byp. (South Oak Street) before finally terminating at another intersection with the SR 135 mainline (South Mill Street). Burnt Church Road continues to the west as an unnumbered street leading to US 221.

Lakeland bypass route

State Route 135 Bypass (SR 135 Byp.) is a  bypass route of SR 135 that is mostly within the city limits of Lakeland. It begins at an intersection with the SR 135 mainline just south of the Lakeland city limits, then intersects SR 135 Loop (only signed as Burnt Church Road) before entering the city. SR 135 Byp. intersects US 129/US 221/SR 11/SR 31/SR 37/SR 122 (Main Street) and travels concurrently with them for two blocks, then turns north onto North College Street in a one-block concurrency with SR 11 Byp., which turns left at East Church Avenue. SR 135 Byp. ends at another intersection with the SR 135 mainline near the Charles Knight Cemetery.

Hazlehurst connector route

State Route 135 Connector (SR 135 Conn.) is a  connecting route of SR 135 that exists mostly within the city limits of Hazlehurst. It connects US 23/SR 19 (Alma Highway/Larry Contos Boulevard) with US 221/SR 135 (Jefferson Street/Cromartie Street). It consists of a southern part of Jefferson Street. The highway is entirely concurrent with US 221 Truck / SR 135 Truck.

Hazlehurst truck route

State Route 135 Truck (SR 135 Truck) is a  truck route of SR 135 that exists mostly within the city limits of Hazlehurst. It is entirely concurrent with US 221 Truck. It begins at an intersection with US 221/SR 135 (Jefferson Street/Cromartie Street). It travels to the southeast on Jefferson Street, concurrent with US 221 Truck and SR 135 Conn., which both begin at this intersection, as well. The three highways cross over some railroad tracks of Norfolk Southern Railway (NS) and then leave the city limits. They intersect US 23/SR 19 (Alma Highway). Here, SR 135 meets its southern terminus, and US 221 Truck and SR 135 Truck turn left onto US 23/SR 19 onto Larry Contos Boulevard. The four highways travel to the north-northeast. Just before passing a Walmart Supercenter, they re-enter Hazlehurst. They cross over some railroad tracks of NS Railway and then intersect US 341/SR 27 (Golden Isles Parkway). Here, all six highways travel to the northwest. At Plum Street, the concurrency intersects the northbound lanes of US 221/SR 135 (since those highways travel through the city on one-way streets). At this intersection, US 221 Truck and SR 135 Truck meet their northern terminus.

See also

References

External links

 

135
Transportation in Echols County, Georgia
Transportation in Lanier County, Georgia
Transportation in Lowndes County, Georgia
Transportation in Berrien County, Georgia
Transportation in Atkinson County, Georgia
Transportation in Coffee County, Georgia
Transportation in Jeff Davis County, Georgia
Transportation in Montgomery County, Georgia